Thomas Hinde (1737–1828) was an American surgeon.

Thomas Hinde may also refer to:
 Thomas Hinde (senior) (1720–1798), English slave trader based in Lancaster
 Thomas Hinde (junior) (1757–1829), English slave trader, son of the above and later a mill owner
 Thomas Hinde (novelist) (1926–2014), English novelist
 Thomas S. Hinde (1785–1846), American newspaper editor, historian, real estate investor, and Methodist minister